"Lollipop" is a song by Big Bang and 2NE1, created to promote a cellphone by LG Cyon. It interpolates the 1958 hit "Lollipop" written by Julius Dixson and Beverly Ross. The song achieved the top spot on various online charts, including a four week run at number one on music portal Mnet. "Lollipop" was used to debut 2NE1 unofficially, as it does not serve as their debut single. 2NE1 followed up with their official debut single "Fire".

Background and release

DJ Wreckx remixed the song for Cyon Bboy Championships. "Lollipop" was used to debut 2NE1 unofficially, as it does not serve as their debut single. In April, YG Entertainment announced that 2NE1 would release a hip hop and reggae song titled "Fire" on May 6, 2009, which would serve as their official debut as a group.

The song was used for an LG Cyon phone. It charted number one on various offline and online charts in South Korea, despite not having any promotional appearances. The song went to sell over 3,000,000 digital downloads and became a commercial success in South Korea, topping the Cyworld digital chart for the month of April 2009.

Music video

The video was filmed in the first week of March 2009. It premiered on March 28, 2009. The video shows both groups dancing together in rainbow and multi-colored shot. A behind-the-scenes version was premiered a few weeks later on May 2, 2009. The video was directed by Seo hyun-seung. On May 15, 2009, YG Entertainment's official YouTube uploaded the full music video.

The original video showed 2NE1 singing in front of a white screen for the intro, then introduces both BigBang and 2NE1 together in a color-changing room. Each is introduced in a solo act with the following rooms: T.O.P in a red or yellow room, G-Dragon in a pink or blue room, Dara in a purple room, CL in a purple or green room, Minzy in a pink room (later edited into a red room, as well), Taeyang in a blue or purple room, Seungri in a yellow or red room donning glasses, Daesung in a pink room, and Bom in a pink room (later edited into a blue room, as well).

An alternate version was later made that did not show the bit of 2NE1 in front of the white screen. Instead, it was replaced with Dara in her blue room, whereas she performed the verse. Other scenes were changed to include the promotion for the LG Cyon cell phone.

Accolades

Track listing
Digital download / streaming
Lollipop – 3:08

Sales

References

2009 songs
2009 debut singles
2NE1 songs
BigBang (South Korean band) songs
YG Entertainment singles
Korean-language songs
Bubblegum pop songs